Linda Day Clark is a photographer, professor, and curator noted for capturing everyday life in African American rural and urban environments, particularly in Gee's Bend. Her work has been shown in the Philadelphia Museum of Art, the Brooklyn Museum of Art, The Lehman College, the Studio Museum in Harlem, and The Smithsonian's Anacostia Community Museum.

Early life and education 
Day Clark moved to Maryland when she was 8 years old. She received her Associate of Arts from Howard Community College, a Bachelor of Fine Arts from the Maryland Institute College of Art in 1994, and a Masters of Fine Art from the University of Delaware in 1996.

Career 
Day Clark was a program associate at the Baltimore Museum of Art until 1998, when left to become a professor of photography at Coppin State University.

In 2002, the New York Times gave Linda Day Clark an assignment to photograph the women quilters of Gee's Bend, a small town southwest of Selma, Alabama, "capturing the red clay soil, laid bare in a dirt road, so rich in color that it seems digitally tweaked but also linked to the rich colors in the quilts."

References

Living people
Year of birth missing (living people)
African-American photographers
African-American women artists
20th-century American photographers
21st-century American photographers
20th-century American women photographers
21st-century American women photographers
Howard Community College alumni
20th-century African-American women
20th-century African-American people
20th-century African-American artists
21st-century African-American women
21st-century African-American artists